Helen Jennifer Dalton is an Australian politician. She has been a member of the New South Wales Legislative Assembly since March 2019, representing the electoral district of Murray as an independent.

Since her election, Dalton has been a vocal critic of NSW Government corruption, water mismanagement and under-funding of rural hospitals, mental health services and infrastructure. She has frequently clashed with government MPs in NSW Parliament, notably Health Minister Brad Hazzard and Water Minister Melinda Pavey, who has labelled Dalton a "disgrace". Former Deputy Premier John Barilaro called her a "disgusting human" on Twitter.

Dalton has campaigned strongly for the establishment of a public register listing all water owners in NSW. She has reported a number of matters to the Independent Commission Against Corruption, including a land sale by Murray River Council and the NSW Government's failure to release a report on re-opening the Narrandera to Tocumwal rail line.

Dalton has been interviewed several times by YouTube Comedian Friendlyjordies, whom he praised "for covering regional council corruption, water, grants and environmental issues that are being overlooked by mainstream media".

Early life and career
Dalton was born in 1959 and raised on a sheep and wheat farm north of Rankin Springs in the Melbergen District.

Dalton studied education and worked as a primary school teacher from 1981 to 1987. She owns a family farming business that produces maize, rice, cereals, cotton, beef cattle, wool and fat lambs. In 2007, she was awarded a Nuffield Australia Farming Scholarship.

Political career
Dalton ran for parliament unsuccessfully in 2015 and 2017 as an independent and for the Shooters, Fishers and Farmers party, respectively. In March 2019, Dalton won the seat of Murray by a 26.2 point swing, breaking 35 years of National Party incumbency. Bookmakers had her as a 9 to 1 outsider just two months before the election.

In her campaign, Dalton presented a plan to address water mismanagement and corruption, argued for a royal commission into the Murray Darling Basin Plan, and pushed for better rural health and hospital services.

She has continued to raise these themes as a state MP. Her maiden speech in NSW Parliament highlighted the rapid decline in service provision and living standards across rural NSW.

Dalton has written a bill to improve transparency on who owns water in NSW The Bill would have forced all state MPs to declare their water interests, and provided for a public water register allowing the public to search for the names of companies and individuals who own water. The legislation passed the NSW Upper House, but was opposed by the NSW Government, who voted it down in the lower house.

A parliamentary speech Dalton gave on the destruction of family farms across Australia has been viewed more than 330,000 times. She has also criticised excessive foreign ownership of Australian water and farmland, and campaigned for mental health services in the bush.

On 3 March 2022, Dalton resigned from the Shooters Fishers and Farmers due to disagreeing with the party's Legislative Council members not showing up to vote against a bill regarding water usage that she believed would "disadvantage communities and irrigators in the lower Darling and Murray river system".

Personal life
Dalton married in 1984 and has four adult children and three grandchildren.

References

21st-century Australian women
21st-century Australian people
Year of birth missing (living people)
Living people
20th-century Australian women
21st-century Australian politicians
Women members of the New South Wales Legislative Assembly
Shooters, Fishers and Farmers Party politicians
Australian schoolteachers
21st-century Australian women politicians